The National Christian Party was a far-right authoritarian and strongly antisemitic political party in Romania active between 1935 and 1938. It was formed by a merger of Octavian Goga's National Agrarian Party and A. C. Cuza's National-Christian Defense League (LANC); a prominent member of the party was the philosopher Nichifor Crainic. Goga was chosen in December 1937 by King Carol II to form a government which included Cuza. The government lasted for only 44 days and was followed by a royal dictatorship by Carol.

History

Founded in 1935, and led by Goga, it never received more than about 10% of the vote, but was chosen in December 1937 by King Carol II to form a government. The party stated that it would rule by the existing constitution but held longer term ambitions at reform, wanting to introduce a smaller parliament and a new corporatist upper chamber. The party was especially noted for its anti-Semitism and Alexander Easterman writes of the party's brief time in office, "Goga proclaimed his policy, openly and unashamed, as designed to rid Roumania  of the Jews. Indeed, he had no other policy to offer; his government was quite simply anti-Semitic and nothing else". In order to underline its anti-Semitic credentials the party adopted the swastika as its emblem, whilst retaining the blue shirt of the LANC as its political uniform. Easterman hypothesizes that Carol had placed this party in power "to give his people a taste of Fascism", hoping vainly that an ensuing reaction against such policies would sweep away not only the relatively weak National Christians but also the far stronger Iron Guard. The party retained close links to the paramilitary Lăncieri, which had previously been close to LANC.

Goga's government was formed on 29 December 1937, and began its term by repudiating Romania's obligations under the 1919 Treaty of Paris, also known as the Minorities Treaty, imposed upon it at the 1919 Paris Peace Conference. The government then introduced a series of anti-semitic laws. On 21 January 1938, it promulgated a decree aimed at reviewing criteria for citizenship (after it cast allegations that previous cabinets had allowed Ukrainian Jews to obtain it illegally). It required all Jews who had received citizenship in 1918-1919 to reapply for it, and set an impossibly high bar for documentary proof of such citizenship, while providing only 20 days in which this could be achieved. It effectively stripped 250,000 Romanian Jews of Romanian citizenship, one third of the Romanian Jewish population. Jewish businesses were closed down; and the resulting disruption took down many non-Jewish businesses and caused massive capital flight.

Besides being an anti-Semite himself, Goga attempted to outflank the Iron Guard's popular support. In press interviews at the time he said:

The regime instituted by Goga and Cuza gave itself a paramilitary wing of Fascist character, the Lăncieri ("Lance-bearers"). They borrowed heavily from the Iron Guard, and started competing with it for public attention. Between 1935 and 1937, the Lăncieri carried out more terrorist actions and pogroms throughout Romania than the Iron Guard. Because of its anti-semitic measures, the Goga-Cuza government has been referred to as "more Nazi than the Germans".

At Goga's request, Carol dissolved parliament on 18 January 1938 with a view toward holding a new election that winter. However, Carol became alarmed with overtures being made by the National Christian Party towards the Iron Guard, and on 10 February 1938, he ended Goga's government after only 45 days, suspended the Constitution, canceled the planned election, and instituted a royal dictatorship. He formed the National Renaissance Front as the single monopoly party and banned all other political parties. He suspended the 1923 Constitution, and created the 1938 Constitution of Romania.

Electoral history

Legislative elections

References

Political parties established in 1935
Defunct political parties in Romania
Defunct Christian political parties
Political parties disestablished in 1938
Fascist parties in Romania
1935 establishments in Romania
Eastern Orthodox political parties
Eastern Orthodoxy and far-right politics
Fascist parties
Romanian nationalist parties
Banned far-right parties
Nazi parties